Capital MetroBus is the bus public transit service of Capital Metropolitan Transportation Authority (Capital Metro) of Austin, Texas and serves Austin and the surrounding areas. MetroBus services include 82 standard routes and 15 high-frequency bus routes . It has several categories of routes: Local, Flyer and Limited, Feeder, Crosstown, Special services and UT Shuttles. Capital Metro also operates an express bus service, MetroExpress, and a bus rapid transit service, MetroRapid, in addition to the agency's commuter rail service, MetroRail.

History 

At the agency's inception, Capital Metro originally operated a series of "paired" route service where two different routes that pass through downtown are served by the same buses, allowing riders to transfer between certain routes without leaving the bus. Since 2008, this practice has been eliminated and after a number of route pair reassignments, the agency merged the paired routes under single route numbers (for example, the 1 North Lamar and 13 South Congress were originally paired as they were the two busiest routes in the system, but they have since been merged as 1 North Lamar/South Congress).

Meanwhile, most local routes carried two digits before Capital Metro assigned a third digit for routes that do not serve downtown in 2000 (for example, 25 Ohlen became 325). Flyer routes were renumbered altogether to match their local stop counterparts (for example, 65 Manchaca Flyer became 103), while express routes that operated during commute times only contained letters (for example, NEX Northeast Express was renamed 990 Manor/Elgin Express; but was originally 70 Northeast Express).

Vehicles 

The majority of the current bus fleet consists of vehicles produced by two manufacturers, Gillig and New Flyer, with only relatively small generational design variations, most visibly in the use of flip-dot destination displays on older series versus LED displays on newer buses. A few smaller series of buses were acquired from other manufacturers, notably Optima (used preferentially on MetroRail shuttles) and MCI (used on express services). Older bus series produced by TMC and Blue Bird are no longer in service.

Standard routes

Local 

MetroBus Local routes are intended to connect specific neighborhoods of Austin to Downtown Austin, with frequent stops.  Since June 2014, north–south service within downtown Austin for all routes is provided via Lavaca Street northbound and Guadalupe Street southbound, with all routes serving at least one stop along both streets.

Prior to relocating routes to the Guadalupe/Lavaca corridor, many routes formerly utilized Brazos Street northbound and Colorado Street southbound before various construction projects took place. Since June 2014, the remaining lines no longer use Congress Avenue between 11th Street and Barton Springs Road. East-west service within downtown Austin for all routes is provided via 5th Street eastbound and 4th and 6th Streets westbound, so as to provide a connection along the Lavaca/Guadalupe corridor.

Some MetroBus routes are designated High-Frequency routes and operate with a headway of 15 minutes between buses weekdays, 20 minutes Saturdays. Routes :

Limited and Flyer 
Capital Metro's Limited and Flyer routes are limited stop services between two destinations.  Limited routes tend to have fewer stops compared to their local counterparts, while Flyer routes serve nonstop between downtown or the UT campus and their neighborhoods of service.  Limited and Flyer routes are designated by routes 100–199. Routes :

Feeder 

Capital Metro's Feeder routes are local services between a neighborhood and a major transfer point for connecting service.  Feeder routes are designated by routes 200–299. Routes :

Crosstown 

Capital Metro's Crosstown routes are local services between two neighborhoods of Austin, for which the route does not pass through Downtown Austin or the University of Texas. Some Crosstown routes are designated High-Frequency routes and operate with a headway of 15 minutes between buses weekdays, 20 minutes Saturdays.  Crosstown routes are designated by routes 300–399.

Round Rock 

Capital Metro operates several services in the suburb Round Rock. Round Rock is not a Capital Metro member city and therefore doesn't pay the 1% sales tax to Capital Metro. Instead, Round Rock contracts Capital Metro to provide certain mass transit services for the city. Round Rock services are designated as 50-99 and 152. Capital Metro also operates MetroExpress route 980 North MoPac Express and Flyer service 152 Round Rock Tech Ridge Limited between downtown Austin and Round Rock. Routes :

Special service 

Capital Metro's special service routes are routes that do not fit in any other category.  Special service routes are designated as routes 400–499.

Night Owl 

Night Owl buses are overnight services.

E-Bus 

Capital Metro has, since September 19, 2002, operated "E-Bus" routes, to ferry students between student residential areas to the 6th Street area.  These buses run only evenings and late nights on weekends and do not run in summer.  The E in "E-Bus" stands for "eating and entertainment" and funding was initially provided by companies advertising on the bus.  On April 1, 2010, the Daily Texan reported that, in an attempt to curb passenger unruliness, Capital Metro was requiring students swipe their student IDs before boarding and that UT would start paying for some of the services.

Other special services 

Routes :

MetroExpress 

Capital Metro's Express services are limited stop services that run between Downtown Austin and the far suburbs.  Express routes are designated as routes 900–999, and are served exclusively by buses in the red "MetroExpress" livery (though on occasions they may be served by buses in the regular Capital Metro livery as well).

MetroRapid 

In January 2014, Capital Metro launched a bus rapid transit service branded "MetroRapid," utilizing articulated buses operating in shared lanes with automobile traffic. Service on the first route, MetroRapid North Lamar/South Congress (801), began on January 26, 2014. It replaced existing bus Routes 1L and 1M, as well as the 101 Express, which traveled along the same corridor.

A second route, MetroRapid Burnet/South Lamar (803), serves a total of 24 stations between The Domain and Westgate.  Both the 801 and 803 drew citizen protest until premium fares were discontinued in 2017 and the 801 had also reduced frequency of the then operating 1L/1M.

UT Shuttle 

The University of Texas Shuttle system, operated by Capital Metro, is one of the largest university transit systems in the United States. It comprises 10 routes and carries over 5.2 million passengers a year. UT students, faculty, and staff may ride the shuttles at no charge with a valid UT photo ID. Without a UT photo ID, normal MetroBus rates apply.

UT Shuttle history 
Capital Metro took over university shuttle operations in 1989. Formerly, service had been provided by private bus companies. Immediate changes included upgraded buses with air conditioning, but also lengthening headway on some routes.

In 1983, the University of Texas received six bids to manage the shuttle system. Capital Metro entered into the picture in 1988, when the university contracted out to them. Capital Metro, in turn, then subcontracted out to Laidlaw International, Inc., who had, up to that point, operated orange and white school buses for the university on a contractual basis. Rather than use Laidlaw's existing bus fleet, however, Capital Metro used their own.  In so doing, Capital Metro brought air conditioning and wheelchair accessibility to the shuttle service for the first time. The transition, however, was not without controversy. Among the other contested issues was the fact that these new shuttles didn't have a stereo system

In 1991, Capital Metro canceled its contract with Laidlaw and contracted out with DAVE Transportation, instead

Amidst allegations of union busting, in 1999, Capital Metro canceled its then current contract and instead contracted out with ATC/Vancom, instead Six years later, in 2005, Capital Metro, citing concerns over the comparatively low wages ATC/Vancom paid, negotiated a contract with First Transit to operate the UT shuttle buses.

UT Shuttle routes 
The UT Shuttle system includes a number of routes during the University of Texas semester.  They do not operate on Saturdays, except during finals. Since September 2014, numbered routes have been used exclusively at bus stops, though signage on buses may use either numbered or lettered signage.

Routes :

Former services

Dillo 

Capital Metro's Dillo service was a circulator service in downtown Austin. In May 2000, the Dillo service went through a major restructuring. It was shut down in 2009 after over 30 years of operation due to low ridership. The service used forest-green trolley buses with an armadillo painted on the side. It was free until shortly before to its closure when Capital Metro began charging a 50¢ fare.

MetroAirport 

The MetroAirport service (sometimes called MetroAirport Flyer) was created when Austin–Bergstrom International Airport opened in May 1999. It was primarily served by buses carrying the "MetroAirport" livery, though may on occasion have been served by buses in the regular livery. The service was eliminated on June 3, 2018, and replaced by the extension of 20.

See also 

Texas Department of Transportation
Dallas Area Rapid Transit
Metropolitan Transit Authority of Harris County

References

External links 

Capital Metropolitan Transportation Authority

Bus transportation in Texas
Capital Metro
Transportation in Austin, Texas